Kirk Shepherd (born 5 October 1986) is an English former professional darts player who competed in Professional Darts Corporation (PDC) tournaments. He is best known for finishing as runner-up in the 2008 PDC World Darts Championship after starting the tournament as a 1000/1 outsider. He remains the youngest player to reach the final of the event.

Career

BDO
Shepherd won the Winmau World Youth Masters in 2003, the British Teenage Singles Champion in 2004 and 2006 and was twice voted British Darts Organisation Young Player of the Year in 2005 and 2006. At the age of just 18, he reached the final of the BDO Gold Cup in 2005. In 2006, he reached the quarter finals of the England Open, before switching from the BDO circuit to join the PDC in November 2006.

PDC
Shepherd's first 12 months in the PDC were not particularly successful – with just a couple of last 32 placings in the non-televised Pro Tour events and reached only 142 in the world rankings by the time of the qualifying rounds for the 2008 World Championship. Shepherd then qualified at the last chance PDPA qualifier to earn a place at the tournament proper at the Alexandra Palace.

He then produced a series of major upsets at the 2008 World Championships, beating Terry Jenkins in the first round – then Mick McGowan and Barrie Bates and three-times former finalist Peter Manley to reach the semi-finals. Jenkins missed seven darts to beat him, McGowan missed four darts and Manley missed two darts to end his run, but he continued to progress. He then defeated Wayne Mardle, who had been installed as tournament favourite after his upset victory over Phil Taylor in the previous round, 6–4 in the semi-final and met John Part in the final on New Year's Day. He failed to produce the form he had shown in the tournament and scored the lowest average by a finalist in the PDC World Championship during his 2–7 loss. He collected the runners-up cheque for £50,000 – his previous career earnings had been £16,970. Shepherd qualified for the Grand Slam of Darts in 2008 and his world ranking jumped from 173 at the start of 2007 to 22nd at the start of 2008. After the match, he quit his job where he had worked in a factory.

However, Shepherd was unable to continue his form throughout 2008, losing out in the last 64 in the UK Open and failing to qualify for the Las Vegas Desert Classic and the 2008 World Matchplay championship. Shepherd did play in the 2008 Grand Slam in November but lost all three of his group games, losing 5–1 to Raymond van Barneveld and 5–0 to Gary Mawson before narrowly losing 5–4 to Robert Thornton.

Shepherd entered the 2009 World Championship as the number 23 seed and faced Jan van der Rassel in the first round, losing 3–2 in a tie-break.

In August 2009, Shepherd showed signs of his old form, reaching the quarter finals in the US Open for the very first time. This was followed up in November 2009 by winning 2 of his 3 group games in the 2009 Grand Slam of Darts to reach the second round, where he lost 5–10 to Kevin Painter.

In March 2010, Shepherd reached the quarter finals of the PDPA Players Championship 7 Wigan at the Robin Park Tennis Centre in Wigan. He lost 0–6 to Colin Lloyd.

In September 2011, Shepherd reached the quarter finals of the PDPA Players Championships 18 Derby at the Moorways Centre in Derby. He lost 1–6 to Paul Nicholson.

In February 2013, he was ranked seven of the nine Tour Card winners from the Q School Order of Merit.

In 2015, Shepherd competed in the PDC Unicorn Challenge Tour who is open to all PDPA Associate Members who failed to win a Tour Card at Qualifying School. He reached two finals, winning 5–3 against Jack Tweddel in March and losing 2–5 against Martin Lukeman in September.

In 2017, Shepherd entered qualifying school and got a tour card on day 4. His best result on the Pro Tour was a quarter final in the 13th players championship event.

Shepherd did have some good performances on the euro tour, noticeably when he hit a 170 checkout against Simon Whitlock, but wasn’t winning the tight matches hence he lost his tour card at the end of 2018 and returned to Q school in the 2019 edition, where on the first day he made it to the final but was beat by Jamie Hughes 5–2. On the second day he failed to win a match. On the third day he won one game giving him a hard task on the final day needing at least a last sixteen run to be in contention for a card. Despite that he went on and won the fourth and final day by beating Kevin Painter 5–2 to retain his tour card for the 2019–2020 seasons. This also means he is guaranteed a spot for the next two stagings of the UK Open.

On 14 February 2021, Shepherd managed to regain his tour card beating Jack Main 6–1 in the final of the first day of 2021 PDC UK Qualifying School.

On 5 January 2022 he handed in his tour card due to problems with dartitis.

Personal life

Shepherd became a father to a son, Callum, in early 2009. In June 2011, Shepherd became a father for the second time to son Jack, and another son, Alfie, in February 2017.

Shepherd is a Second Dan black belt at karate, thus providing two of his nicknames, "The Karate Kid" and "The Martial Dartist".

World Championship results

PDC
2008: Runner-up (lost to John Part 2–7)
2009: 1st round (lost to Jan van der Rassel 2–3)
2010: 3rd round (lost to Mark Webster 1–4)
2011: 1st round (lost to Wayne Jones 1–3)

Career finals

PDC premier event finals: 1 (1 runner-up)

Performance timeline

References

External links

English darts players
1986 births
Living people
Professional Darts Corporation former tour card holders
People from Ramsgate
British Darts Organisation players